The Snow Leopard Commando Unit (Simplified Chinese: 雪豹突击队), formerly known as the Snow Wolf Commando Unit (Abbreviation: SWCU; Simplified Chinese: 雪狼突击队), is a highly elite police tactical unit of the People's Republic of China under the People's Armed Police (PAP), tasked with counterterrorism, hostage rescue, riot control, serving high-risk arrest and search warrants, and other special tasks such as anti-hijacking, anti-WMD terrorism, bomb disposal, counterinsurgency, crowd control, law enforcement tactics against crime, VBSS, VIP protection. The SLCU, along with Beijing Municipal Public Security Bureau's SWAT unit (under the Ministry of Public Security (MPS)), was tasked with many of the security responsibilities of the 2008 Summer Olympics. 

Officially, the SLCU is known as the 3rd Group, 13th Detachment, People's Armed Police Beijing General Corps.

The former "Snow Wolf" name was bestowed on the unit because of the known tenacity of Arctic wolves and their ability to both survive and thrive in extremely harsh conditions.

History

After its secret establishment in December 2002, the Snow Wolf Commando Unit (SWCU) trained out of the public eye for five years. The SWCU and the Beijing SWAT unit were unveiled in a demonstration at the Beijing Police Academy on 27 April 2006 as part of a public relations effort to illustrate the capabilities of the PAP to deal with terrorism, the protection of delegates, and to enforce law and order in the 2008 Beijing Olympics. The SWCU had participated in anti-terrorist exercises with Russia on 4 September 2007 known as "Cooperation-2007." On 13 November 2007, SWCU operators were involved in anti-terrorist exercise before foreign military VIPs. SWCU operators have been deployed to Afghanistan and Iraq to protect Chinese diplomatic personnel.

The unit underwent a name change in 2008 and became officially known as the Snow Leopard Commando Unit. According to Qu Liangfeng, a senior PAP officer in charge of the daily operations of SWCU, the name change was "inspired by the story of a brave and cunning snow leopard, which escaped an ambush by a hunter and his eight hunting dogs."

In 2011, the SLCU was deployed to Xinjiang in order to assist local police forces to deal with anti-terrorism. They were also present to ensure security at the China-Eurasian Expo convention being held there.

In 2013 and 2014, the SLCU participated in the Annual Warrior Competition.

Training and selection
Only officers who have served in the People's Armed Police for a period of 1 to 2 years are eligible to apply, after which they will be put through a process of interviews and physical and psychological tests. The average age (as of 2006) of SLCU officers is 22 years, as most entered the unit at about 18 years of age, making them amongst the youngest in the Chinese counter-terrorism community.

The officers who are eventually selected for the course undergo an arduous period of physical training, driving lessons for various vehicles, and weapons training. Their physical training includes 200 push-ups, 200 sit-ups, 100 squats, lifting barbells 200 times and carrying a 35 kg load for a 10 km cross-country run. They are then assigned to the Beijing General Corps' 13th Detachment, where the SLCU is based.

Organisation
The SLCU consists of four squadrons assigned with very specific responsibilities:

Weapons and equipment
The SLCU was shown in the demonstrations armed with the QBZ-95B-1 and QSZ-92, but they will most likely also be armed with a wide variety of submachine guns and other firearms. The SLCU is armed with the JS9, the CS/LM6, the QBS06, QBZ09, the PF89 and the QLU-11. The unit also uses the Norinco CQ-A.

The unit has spent about CNY 2 million (approximately US$ 258,000) in domestically manufactured armored personnel carriers for riot control and has also imported CNY 4 million worth of American-manufactured vehicles and equipment.

Each SLCU operator is estimated to be outfitted with CNY 300,000 (approximately US$48,000) worth of equipment, including their body armor and communications equipment. The SLCU is the first unit in the PAP to be equipped with the W-15 helmet, an improved version of the QGF11, in 2015.

Uniform
The SLCU is known to wear the Type 05 digital camouflage uniform issued by the PAP, although they are now using the Type 07 digital camouflage uniform. In overseas operations, they have velcro patches with the Chinese flag and 'CHINA' on the patch, usually with the language of the region where they operate in.

See also
Special Police Unit

References

Bibliography
 

Units and formations of the People's Armed Police
Police tactical units
Special forces of the People's Republic of China
Specialist law enforcement agencies of China